Lake Çıldır (Tsovak lič,  Črdilis tba, meaning "lake of shadows"), is a large freshwater lake in Ardahan Province in northeastern Turkey. Water from the lake is used for irrigation.

References

Lake Çıldır at BirdLife International

Cildir
Landforms of Ardahan Province
Landforms of Kars Province
Important Bird Areas of Turkey
Arpaçay District
Çıldır District